Dallam Tower is a grade I listed  country house in Beetham parish, near Milnthorpe, South Lakeland, Cumbria, England.  It is a member of the Historic Houses Association  but is not open to the public except for occasional charity events, visits to the garden through the National Garden Scheme, and as a wedding venue.

The house is described as "Early C18 with C17 core, remodelled early C19" and has rainwater pipes dated 1722; its interiors include panelling by Gillow of Lancaster. The shelter was damaged by fire in April 2021. A public road and several public footpaths run through the deer park.

It has sometimes been erroneously referred to as Dallam Castle, and an earlier spelling was Dalham Tower. Before local government reorganisation in 1974 Dallam Tower was in the county of Westmorland.

History

A pele tower was built on the site in about 1375 but demolished when the present house was built in 1720–23.  A plan dated 1614 indicates that at that time there was a house with formal gardens.

Notable residents included Daniel Wilson (1680 – 1754)  and his son Edward Wilson (c. 1719–1764),  who were both Members of Parliament for Westmorland.

Ships 
At least two ships have been named Dallam Tower, presumably in recognition of a connection with the house.

In 1823 the Lancaster Gazette reported that a brig called Dallam Tower had run aground and broken up en route from Dublin to Whitehaven. It is reported to have been built "about 1758, probably at Milnthorpe".

The Dallam Tower was built in 1866 in Birkenhead for the Lancaster Ship-owners Company, and launched by Mrs Wilson, wife of Mr G. E. Wilson of Dallam Tower. It was the third ship built for that company, and was intended for passenger traffic between  Liverpool and Melbourne. In 1873 this ship reached Port Chalmers, New Zealand, after a dramatic voyage in which she had lost a mast and travelled 2,000 miles under a jury rig, and was the focus of much attention.

A Lancaster-registered ship named the Dallam Tower was wrecked off Java in March 1889 with a cargo of coal from Newcastle.

See also

Grade I listed buildings in Cumbria
Listed buildings in Beetham

References

External links
 A compilation of references in maps and gazetteers, with some illustrations
 Dallam Tower Estate official website

Country houses in Cumbria
Grade I listed houses in Cumbria
Beetham